Bahmanyar, also rendered as Bahman Yari, in Iran, may refer to:
 Bahmanyar-e Gharbi
 Bahmanyar-e Sharqi